The arrondissement of Laon is an arrondissement of France in the Aisne department in the Hauts-de-France region. It has 240 communes.

Composition

The communes of the arrondissement of Laon, and their INSEE codes, are:

 Abbécourt (02001) 
 Achery (02002) 
 Agnicourt-et-Séchelles (02004) 
 Aguilcourt (02005) 
 Aizelles (02007) 
 Amifontaine (02013) 
 Amigny-Rouy (02014) 
 Andelain (02016) 
 Anguilcourt-le-Sart (02017) 
 Anizy-le-Grand (02018) 
 Arrancy (02024) 
 Assis-sur-Serre (02027) 
 Athies-sous-Laon (02028) 
 Aubigny-en-Laonnois (02033) 
 Aulnois-sous-Laon (02037) 
 Autremencourt (02039) 
 Autreville (02041) 
 Barenton-Bugny (02046) 
 Barenton-Cel (02047) 
 Barenton-sur-Serre (02048) 
 Barisis-aux-Bois (02049) 
 Bassoles-Aulers (02052) 
 Beaumont-en-Beine (02056) 
 Beaurieux (02058) 
 Beautor (02059) 
 Berrieux (02072) 
 Berry-au-Bac (02073) 
 Bertaucourt-Epourdon (02074) 
 Bertricourt (02076) 
 Besmé (02078) 
 Besny-et-Loizy (02080) 
 Béthancourt-en-Vaux (02081) 
 Bièvres (02088) 
 Bichancourt (02086) 
 Blérancourt (02093) 
 Bois-lès-Pargny (02096) 
 Boncourt (02097) 
 Bosmont-sur-Serre (02101) 
 Bouconville-Vauclair (02102) 
 Bouffignereux (02104) 
 Bourg-et-Comin (02106) 
 Bourguignon-sous-Coucy (02107) 
 Bourguignon-sous-Montbavin (02108) 
 Brancourt-en-Laonnois (02111) 
 Braye-en-Laonnois (02115) 
 Brie (02122) 
 Bruyères-et-Montbérault (02128) 
 Bucy-lès-Cerny (02132) 
 Bucy-lès-Pierrepont (02133) 
 Caillouël-Crépigny (02139) 
 Camelin (02140) 
 Caumont (02145) 
 Cerny-en-Laonnois (02150) 
 Cerny-lès-Bucy (02151) 
 Cessières-Suzy (02153) 
 Chaillevois (02155) 
 Chalandry (02156) 
 Chambry (02157) 
 Chamouille (02158) 
 Champs (02159) 
 Charmes (02165) 
 Châtillon-lès-Sons (02169) 
 Chaudardes (02171) 
 Chauny (02173) 
 Chérêt (02177) 
 Chermizy-Ailles (02178) 
 Chéry-lès-Pouilly (02180) 
 Chevregny (02183) 
 Chivres-en-Laonnois (02189) 
 Chivy-lès-Étouvelles (02191) 
 Cilly (02194) 
 Clacy-et-Thierret (02196) 
 Colligis-Crandelain (02205) 
 Commenchon (02207) 
 Concevreux (02208) 
 Condé-sur-Suippe (02211) 
 Condren (02212) 
 Corbeny (02215) 
 Coucy-lès-Eppes (02218) 
 Coucy-la-Ville (02219) 
 Coucy-le-Château-Auffrique (02217) 
 Courbes (02222) 
 Courtrizy-et-Fussigny (02229) 
 Couvron-et-Aumencourt (02231) 
 Crécy-au-Mont (02236) 
 Crécy-sur-Serre (02237) 
 Crépy (02238) 
 Craonne (02234) 
 Craonnelle (02235) 
 Cuirieux (02248) 
 Cuiry-lès-Chaudardes (02250) 
 Cuissy-et-Geny (02252) 
 Danizy (02260) 
 Dercy (02261) 
 Deuillet (02262) 
 Ébouleau (02274) 
 Eppes (02282) 
 Erlon (02283) 
 Étouvelles (02294) 
 Évergnicourt (02299) 
 La Fère (02304) 
 Festieux (02309) 
 Folembray (02318) 
 Fourdrain (02329) 
 Fresnes-sous-Coucy (02333) 
 Fressancourt (02335) 
 Frières-Faillouël (02336) 
 Froidmont-Cohartille (02338) 
 Gizy (02346) 
 Goudelancourt-lès-Berrieux (02349) 
 Goudelancourt-lès-Pierrepont (02350) 
 Grandlup-et-Fay (02353) 
 Guivry (02362) 
 Guny (02363) 
 Guyencourt (02364) 
 Jumencourt (02395) 
 Jumigny (02396) 
 Juvincourt-et-Damary (02399) 
 Landricourt (02406) 
 Laniscourt (02407) 
 Laon (02408) 
 Lappion (02409) 
 Laval-en-Laonnois (02413) 
 Leuilly-sous-Coucy (02423) 
 Lierval (02429) 
 Liesse-Notre-Dame (02430) 
 Liez (02431) 
 Lor (02440) 
 Mâchecourt (02448) 
 Maizy (02453) 
 La Malmaison (02454) 
 Manicamp (02456) 
 Marchais (02457) 
 Marcy-sous-Marle (02460) 
 Marest-Dampcourt (02461) 
 Marle (02468) 
 Martigny-Courpierre (02471) 
 Mauregny-en-Haye (02472)  
 Mayot (02473)  
 Mennessis (02474) 
 Merlieux-et-Fouquerolles (02478)  
 Mesbrecourt-Richecourt (02480)  
 Meurival (02482) 
 Missy-lès-Pierrepont (02486) 
 Molinchart (02489) 
 Monceau-lès-Leups (02492) 
 Monceau-le-Waast (02493) 
 Mons-en-Laonnois (02497) 
 Montaigu (02498) 
 Montbavin (02499) 
 Montchâlons (02501)  
 Monthenault (02508) 
 Montigny-le-Franc (02513) 
 Montigny-sous-Marle (02516) 
 Montigny-sur-Crécy (02517) 
 Mortiers (02529) 
 Moulins (02530) 
 Moussy-Verneuil (02531) 
 Muscourt (02534) 
 Neufchâtel-sur-Aisne (02541) 
 Neuflieux (02542) 
 La Neuville-Bosmont (02545) 
 La Neuville-en-Beine (02546) 
 Neuville-sur-Ailette (02550) 
 Nizy-le-Comte (02553) 
 Nouvion-et-Catillon (02559) 
 Nouvion-le-Comte (02560) 
 Nouvion-le-Vineux (02561) 
 Œuilly (02565) 
 Ognes (02566) 
 Orainville (02572) 
 Orgeval (02573) 
 Oulches-la-Vallée-Foulon (02578) 
 Paissy (02582) 
 Pancy-Courtecon (02583) 
 Parfondru (02587) 
 Pargnan (02588) 
 Pargny-les-Bois (02591) 
 Pierremande (02599) 
 Pierrepont (02600) 
 Pignicourt (02601) 
 Pinon (02602) 
 Ployart-et-Vaurseine (02609) 
 Pont-Saint-Mard (02616) 
 Pontavert (02613) 
 Pouilly-sur-Serre (02617) 
 Prémontré (02619) 
 Presles-et-Thierny (02621) 
 Prouvais (02626) 
 Proviseux-et-Plesnoy (02627) 
 Quierzy (02631) 
 Quincy-Basse (02632) 
 Remies (02638) 
 Rogécourt (02651) 
 Roucy (02656) 
 Royaucourt-et-Chailvet (02661) 
 Saint-Aubin (02671) 
 Sainte-Croix (02675) 
 Sainte-Preuve (02690) 
 Saint-Erme-Outre-et-Ramecourt (02676) 
 Saint-Gobain (02680) 
 Saint-Nicolas-aux-Bois (02685) 
 Saint-Paul-aux-Bois (02686) 
 Saint-Pierremont (02689) 
 Saint-Thomas (02696) 
 Samoussy (02697) 
 Selens (02704) 
 La Selve (02705) 
 Septvaux (02707) 
 Servais (02716) 
 Sinceny (02719) 
 Sissonne (02720) 
 Sons-et-Ronchères (02727) 
 Tavaux-et-Pontséricourt (02737) 
 Tergnier (02738) 
 Thiernu (02742) 
 Toulis-et-Attencourt (02745) 
 Travecy (02746) 
 Trosly-Loire (02750) 
 Trucy (02751) 
 Ugny-le-Gay (02754) 
 Urcel (02755) 
 Variscourt (02761) 
 Vassogne (02764) 
 Vaucelles-et-Beffecourt (02765) 
 Vauxaillon (02768) 
 Vendresse-Beaulne (02778) 
 Verneuil-sous-Coucy (02786) 
 Verneuil-sur-Serre (02787) 
 Versigny (02788) 
 Vesles-et-Caumont (02790) 
 Veslud (02791) 
 La Ville-aux-Bois-lès-Pontavert (02803) 
 Villeneuve-sur-Aisne (02360) 
 Villequier-Aumont (02807) 
 Viry-Noureuil (02820) 
 Vivaise (02821) 
 Vorges (02824) 
 Voyenne (02827) 
 Wissignicourt (02834)

History

The arrondissement of Laon was created in 1800. At the January 2017 reorganization of the arrondissements of Aisne, it lost 30 communes to the arrondissement of Vervins and three to the arrondissement of Soissons.

As a result of the reorganisation of the cantons of France which came into effect in 2015, the borders of the cantons are no longer related to the borders of the arrondissements. The cantons of the arrondissement of Laon were, as of January 2015:

 Anizy-le-Château
 Chauny
 Coucy-le-Château-Auffrique
 Craonne
 Crécy-sur-Serre
 La Fère
 Laon-Nord
 Laon-Sud
 Marle
 Neufchâtel-sur-Aisne
 Rozoy-sur-Serre
 Sissonne
 Tergnier

References

Laon